Liviu-Marian Pop (born 10 May 1974)  is a Romanian politician. He was a very controversial Romanian interim Education Minister in the cabinet of Victor Ponta.

He played an important role during the Victor Ponta doctoral thesis plagiarism controversy (then the Prime Minister) scandal. 
A session of a committee charged with validating academic titles analyzed the Victor Ponta doctoral thesis and decided with a unanimous vote of members present that Ponta had committed copy and paste plagiarism, subsequently requesting the withdrawal of Ponta's doctoral title. In response, interim Education Minister Liviu Pop (PSD) contested the committee's jurisdiction and dismissed the findings, citing the lack of a quorum. The minister had already signed an order reorganizing the committee the previous day, but, due to technical reasons, the order came into effect during the very session analyzing the thesis.

Another committee, subordinated to the Education Ministry, later found that Ponta did not commit plagiarism.

On July 27, 2016 the CNATDCU (Consiliul Naţional de Atestare a Titlurilor, Diplomelor si Certificatelor Universitare) (reformed by the new Education Ministry) has reconfirmed the plagiarism verdict, subsequently requesting the withdrawal of Ponta's doctoral title.

He is also known for making very embarrassing grammar, spelling and logical mistakes, for example misspelling the word "knee" in Romanian ("genunche" instead of "genunchi"), or that "mistakes can be fixed, while errors cannot" („greşelile se pot corecta, erorile nu”), or that "12th grade students have been in school for 17-18 years" ("[...] Vă place cum arăta şcoala, când aţi intrat acum 18 ani sau 17 ani? Atunci aţi intrat în clasa I”). In 2018 a mistake in a by the ministry of education published mathematical manual was discovered. It stated that the number 9 is larger than the number 12. In defense Pop (graduated from the faculty of mathematics and informatics at the Babeș-Bolyai University, Cluj) publicly argued that this could be the case in another number system for example base 5. With basic mathematical knowledge however it can easily be proven that this is impossible.

References

Romanian Ministers of Education
Living people
1974 births